Dashti-Jum, is a village and a jamoat in Tajikistan. It is located in Shamsiddin Shohin District in Khatlon Region. The jamoat has a total population of 4,942 (2015).

References

Populated places in Khatlon Region